Barnes Rugby Football Club (formerly Harrodians Rugby Football Club) is a rugby union club based in Barnes, London. The club currently play in the fourth tier of the English league system, National League 2 East, following an increase of fourth tier leagues from two to three.

History
The club's website states that it was established in Barnes in the 1920s.
For many years the club played at the Harrodian Club before moving to its Barn Elms location in 1987 when the grounds were sold to form a school.
Barnes RFC first XV has been promoted eight times since being positioned in Surrey Division Three in 1987.  The club changed its name from Harrodians to Barnes at the beginning of the 1992–93 season.

Claim of continuity with Barnes Football Club
In 2002, the club's website claimed continuity with Barnes Football Club, stating that "[o]ur earliest recorded match was November 1862 versus Richmond, played at Barn Elms. We won that match and the replay that followed.  For many years we played as Harrodians RFC before moving to our Barn Elms location in 1987."  In 2005, this claim was amplified in The Daily Telegraph by BBC sports presenter John Inverdale.  Inverdale, who stated that he was "[f]or reasons that I'm not altogether clear about, ... one of a number of vice-presidents" of Barnes RFC, wrote that "in 1839, according to the club records, Barnes RFC were born, playing fixtures against a whole mish-mash of teams of which no match results have been kept."

In 2008, the rugby club's website weakened this claim, stating only that "Barnes Rugby Club is a club with a rich history and was established in Barnes in the 1920s. Although there are indeed possibilities that our earliest recorded match was in November 1862 versus Richmond and played at Barn Elms, it is from the 1920s that our true history is clear."  As of 2018, similar wording remains on the current version of the rugby club's website.

Honours
 Surrey 3 champions: 1987–88
 Surrey 2 champions (2): 1988–89, 1992–93
 Surrey 1 champions: 1995–96
 London 2 (south-east v south-west) promotion play-off winner: 2002–03
 London Division 2 South champions: 2004–05
 National League 3 (south-east v south-west) promotion play-off winners (2): 2008–09, 2014–15
 London & South East Premier champions (2): 2010–11, 2017–18

Current standings

Notes

References

External links
 Official site

Clubs and societies in London
English rugby union teams
Rugby clubs established in 1920
Rugby union clubs in London
Sport in Barnes, London
Sport in the London Borough of Richmond upon Thames